The Middleborough Historical Museum is a museum located at 18 Jackson Street, Middleborough, Massachusetts, and maintained by the Middleborough Historical Association. It is sometimes known as the Tom Thumb Museum for its extensive holdings of personal items from General Tom Thumb and his wife Lavinia Warren, who lived in the nearby Tom Thumb House. The museum was founded in 1961, and currently comprises 7 buildings as follows:

References 
 Middleborough Historical Association
 Tom Thumb Museum
 Middleborough Historical Museum brochure
 Roadside America entry

Middleborough, Massachusetts
History museums in Massachusetts
Museums in Plymouth County, Massachusetts